Danny Alberto Fonseca Bravo (born 7 November 1979) is a Costa Rican former professional footballer who last played as a midfielder for Costa Rican club Cartaginés.

Club career
A native of Cartago, Fonseca played the majority of his career at local side Cartaginés. In February 2013 he tied club legend Leonel Hernández for most league games played for the club, with 360. He also had a few seasons at Brujas, but returned to Cartaginés in May 2010.

In October 2013, Fonseca reached 500 league games in the Costa Rican Primera División, the 14th player in the league history to do so.

International career
Fonseca played at the 1999 FIFA World Youth Championship held in Nigeria.

He made his senior debut for Costa Rica in a February 2003 UNCAF Nations Cup match against Honduras and collected a total of 28 caps, scoring 2 goals. He represented his country in 4 FIFA World Cup qualification matches and was selected as a member of the Costa Rica squad at the 2006 FIFA World Cup finals. He was the first player to be booked in the FIFA World Cup 2006 during his country's 4–2 defeat to Germany. Also he played at the 2003 and 2005 UNCAF Nations Cups as well as at the 2005 CONCACAF Gold Cup. He was a non-playing squad member at the 2004 Copa América.

His final international was a January 2008 friendly match 1994 against Iran.

International goals
Scores and results list Costa Rica's goal tally first.

References

External links
 
 Nacion profile 

1979 births
Living people
People from Cartago Province
Association football midfielders
Costa Rican footballers
Costa Rica international footballers
Costa Rica under-20 international footballers
2003 UNCAF Nations Cup players
2004 Copa América players
2005 UNCAF Nations Cup players
2005 CONCACAF Gold Cup players
2006 FIFA World Cup players
Liga FPD players
C.S. Cartaginés players
Brujas FC players
Copa Centroamericana-winning players